Dominion is an unincorporated community located in Kent Island (the largest island in the Chesapeake Bay) which is in Queen Anne's County, Maryland, United States.

References

Kent Island, Maryland
Unincorporated communities in Queen Anne's County, Maryland
Unincorporated communities in Maryland